is a former Japanese cyclist. He competed in the team pursuit at the 1960 Summer Olympics.

References

External links
 

1943 births
Living people
Japanese male cyclists
Olympic cyclists of Japan
Cyclists at the 1960 Summer Olympics
People from Gunma Prefecture